Lipce may refer to the following places:

In Poland:

Lipce, Lower Silesian Voivodeship (south-west Poland)
Lipce, Kuyavian-Pomeranian Voivodeship (north-central Poland)
Lipce, West Pomeranian Voivodeship (north-west Poland)

In Slovenia:

Lipce, Jesenice, a settlement in the Municipality of Jesenice

See also 
Lipce Reymontowskie, Skierniewice County, Łódź Voivodeship